Ron Kimmel (b. 1963) is a professor of Computer Science and Electrical and Computer Engineering (by courtesy)  at the Technion Israel Institute of Technology. He holds a D.Sc. degree in electrical engineering (1995) from the Technion, and was a post-doc at UC Berkeley and Berkeley Labs, and a visiting professor at Stanford University. He has worked in various areas of image and shape analysis in computer vision, image processing, and computer graphics. Kimmel's interest in recent years has been non-rigid shape processing and analysis, medical imaging, computational biometry, deep learning, numerical optimization of problems with a geometric flavor, and applications of metric and differential geometry. Kimmel is an author of two books, an editor of one, and an author of numerous articles. He is the founder of the Geometric Image Processing Lab , and a founder and advisor of several successful image processing and analysis companies.

Kimmel's contributions include the development of fast marching methods for triangulated manifolds (together with James Sethian), the geodesic active contours algorithm for image segmentation, a geometric framework for image filtering (named Beltrami flow after the Italian mathematician Eugenio Beltrami), and the Generalized Multidimensional Scaling (together with his students the Bronstein brothers) with which he was able to compute the Gromov-Hausdorff distance between surfaces. He is one of the founders of the field of deep learning based computational oncology/pathology together with his student Gil Shamai.

In 2003, he appeared in an interview to WNBC on the use of geometric approaches in three-dimensional face recognition.
In 2011 his cofounded company - InVision was acquired by Intel. 
For ten years he played a leading role in the research and development of Intel RealSense technologies, as a part time Intel senior academic research fellow.
In 2022 he cofounded Lumix.AI  where he serves as a chief scientific officer.

Work
 Medical imaging, computer graphics, computer vision, deep learning, and Image processing

Awards

 SIAM Fellow for contributions to shape reconstruction, image processing, and geometric analysis, 2019
 SIAG Imaging Science Best Paper Prize for SIAM J. Imaging Science'2013. Scale invariant geometry for non-rigid shapes, 2016
Helmholtz Prize (ICCV Test-of-Time Award) for his 1995 paper on Geodesic Active Contours, 2013
 IEEE Fellow  for his contributions to image processing and non-rigid shape analysis, 2009
 Counter Terrorism Award, 2003
 Henry Taub Prize, 2001
 Hershel Rich innovation award, 2001, 2003
 Alon Fellowship, 1998–2001

Books
 "Numerical Geometry of Images" published in 2003 by Springer
 "Numerical Geometry of Non-Rigid Shapes" (with Alex and Michael Bronstein) published by Springer in 2009.

External links
 Ron Kimmel's page at the Technion
 Kimmel in a CNN news report

Living people
Israeli computer scientists
Computer vision researchers
Technion – Israel Institute of Technology alumni
Fellow Members of the IEEE
Fellows of the Society for Industrial and Applied Mathematics
1963 births